Donald Joseph Delandro (July 20, 1935 – January 29, 2021) was a United States Army brigadier general who served as Adjutant General of the United States Army from 1984 to 1985, the first African-American to serve in the position.

Education 
He was a 1956 graduate of Southern University and A&M College with a B.S. degree in business administration. Delandro later earned an M.B.A. degree from the University of Chicago.

Personal life 
Delandro was Catholic, a parishioner at St Joseph Catholic Church in Alexandria, Virginia.

References

1935 births
2021 deaths
People from New Orleans
Southern University alumni
African-American United States Army personnel
United States Army personnel of the Vietnam War
Recipients of the Air Medal
Recipients of the Meritorious Service Medal (United States)
University of Chicago Booth School of Business alumni
Recipients of the Legion of Merit
United States Army generals
Adjutants general of the United States Army
People from Alexandria, Virginia
Burials at Arlington National Cemetery
African-American Catholics
20th-century African-American people
21st-century African-American people